Tanzania Portland Cement Company Limited (TPCC), also Twiga Cement is a cement-manufacturing company in Tanzania. It is the first company in Tanzania to start  manufacturing cement; in 1966.

As of 2020, Twiga Cement is a member of the  Heidelberg Group and Twiga's shares of stock are listed on the Dar es Salaam Stock Exchange, where they trade under the symbol:TWIGA.

Location
The geographical coordinates of the Twiga Cement factory are:06°39'47.0"S, 39°10'03.0"E (Latitude:-6.663064; Longitude:39.167502).

Overview
Twiga Cement is  large cement manufacturer, that manufactures three brands of portland cement; (a) Twiga Ordinary (b) Twiga Plus+ and (c) Twiga Extra. In 2014, the factory expanded and increased its manufacturing capacity to  annually.

According to the company's annual report, in December 2018, the company's total assets were TSh:322.76 billion (US$141 million), with shareholders' equity of TSh:224.94 billion (US$98 million). That year, the company employed 285 people.

History 
The company was founded in 1959 as Tanzania Portland Cement Company, producing its first bag of cement in mid-1966. It was a joint venture between Cementia AG of Switzerland, with 80 percent shareholding and the government of Tanzania, through the Tanzania Development Corporation, owning 20 percent.
In 1967, the government increased its ownership to 50 percent. In 1973 the company was nationalized with the government of Tanzania now owning 100 percent of the company.

In 1992, the government sold 13 percent ownership to Scancem International ANS of Norway and noter 13 percent to Swedfund International AB of Sweden. The government retained 74 percent ownership. In 1998 the company was re-privatized. At that time, the shareholding in the company was as illustrated in the table below.

Ownership
In 2006, the government of Tanzania divested from the company by floating its shareholding on the Dar es Salaam Stock Exchange, where the company stock trades under the symbol TWIGA.

As of December 2018, the shareholding in the company stock was as depicted in the table below.

Governance
Hakan Gurdal serves as the Chairman of the board of directors. Alfonso Velez serves as the Managing Director.

See also
 Tanga Cement
 Cement in Africa

References

External links 
 Official Webpage
 Company Page At Dar es Salaam Stock Exchange

Cement companies of Tanzania
Economy of Dar es Salaam
Tanzanian brands
Manufacturing companies established in 1959
Companies listed on the Dar es Salaam Stock Exchange
1959 establishments in Tanganyika